This is a list of diseases starting with the letter "R".

Ra

Rab–Rai
 Rabies
 Rabson–Mendenhall syndrome
 Radial defect Robin sequence
 Radial hypoplasia, triphalangeal thumbs and hypospadias
 Radial ray agenesis
 Radial ray hypoplasia choanal atresia
 Radiation induced angiosarcoma of the breast
 Radiation induced meningioma
 Radiation leukemia
 Radiation related neoplasm /cancer
 Radiation syndromes
 Radiation-induced brachial plexopathy
 Radiation-induced lumbosacral plexopathy
 Radiculomegaly of canine teeth congenital cataract
 Radio digito facial dysplasia
 Radio renal syndrome
 Radiophobia
 Radioulnar synostosis mental retardation hypotonia
 Radioulnar synostosis retinal pigment abnormalities
 Radio-ulnar synostosis type 1
 Radio-ulnar synostosis type 2
 Radius absent anogenital anomalies
 Raine syndrome

Ram–Ray
 Rambam Hasharon syndrome
 Rambaud–Galian syndrome
 Ramer–Ladda syndrome
 Ramon syndrome
 Ramos-Arroyo syndrome
 Ramsay Hunt paralysis syndrome
 Rapadilino syndrome
 Rapp–Hodgkin syndrome
 Rapunzel syndrome
 Rasmussen's encephalitis
 Rasmussen–Johnsen–Thomsen syndrome
 Rasmussen subacute encephalitis
 Ray–Peterson–Scott syndrome
 Raynaud's disease/phenomenon
 Rayner–Lampert–Rennert syndrome

Re

Rea–Reg
 Reactive airway disease
 Reactive arthritis
 Reactive attachment disorder (RAD)
 Reactive attachment disorder of early childhood
 Reactive attachment disorder of infancy
 Reactive hypoglycemia
 Reardon–Hall–Slaney syndrome
 Reardon–Wilson–Cavanagh syndrome
 Rectal neoplasm
 Rectophobia
 Rectosigmoid neoplasm
 Recurrent laryngeal papillomas
 Recurrent peripheral facial palsy
 Recurrent respiratory papillomatosis
 Reductional transverse limb defects
 Reflex sympathetic dystrophy syndrome
 Reflux esophagitis
 Refractory anemia
 Refsum disease, infantile form
 Refsum disease
 Reginato–Shiapachasse syndrome
 Regional enteritis

Rei
 Reifenstein syndrome
 Reinhardt–Pfeiffer syndrome

Ren

Rena

Renal

Renal a – Renal g
 Renal adysplasia dominant type
 Renal agenesis meningomyelocele mullerian defect
 Renal agenesis, bilateral
 Renal agenesis
 Renal artery stenosis
 Renal calculi
 Renal caliceal diverticuli deafness
 Renal cancer
 Renal carcinoma, familial
 Renal cell carcinoma
 Renal dysplasia diffuse autosomal recessive
 Renal dysplasia diffuse cystic
 Renal dysplasia limb defects
 Renal dysplasia megalocystis sirenomelia
 Renal dysplasia mesomelia radiohumeral fusion
 Renal failure
 Renal genital middle ear anomalies
 Renal glycosuria

Renal h – Renal t
 Renal hepatic pancreatic dysplasia Dandy Walker cyst
 Renal hypoplasia
 Renal hypertension
 Renal osteodystrophy
 Renal rickets
 Renal tubular acidosis progressive nerve deafness
 Renal tubular acidosis, distal, autosomal dominant
 Renal tubular acidosis, distal, autosomal recessive
 Renal tubular acidosis, distal, type 3
 Renal tubular acidosis, distal, type 4
 Renal tubular acidosis, distal
 Renal tubular acidosis
 Renal tubular transport disorders inborn

Reni–Reno
 Renier–Gabreels–Jasper syndrome
 Renoanogenital syndrome
 Renoprival hypertension

Rep–Res
 Reperfusion injury
 Repetitive strain injury (RSI)
 Resistance to LH (luteinizing hormone)
 Resistance to thyroid stimulating hormone
 Respiratory acidosis
 Respiratory chain deficiency malformations
 Respiratory distress syndrome, adult
 Respiratory distress syndrome, infant
 Restless legs syndrome

Reti–Retr
 Reticuloendotheliosis
 Retina disorder
 Retinal degeneration
 Retinal dysplasia X linked
 Retinal telangiectasia hypogammaglobulinemia
 Retinitis pigmentosa
 Retinitis pigmentosa-deafness
 Retinis pigmentosa deafness hypogenitalism
 Retinitis pigmentosa mental retardation deafness
 Retinoblastoma
 Retinohepatoendocrinologic syndrome
 Retinopathy anemia CNS anomalies
 Retinopathy aplastic anemia neurological abnormalities
 Retinopathy pigmentary mental retardation
 Retinopathy, arteriosclerotic
 Retinopathy, diabetic
 Retinoschisis
 Retinoschisis, juvenile
 Retinoschisis, X-linked
 Retrograde amnesia
 Retrolental fibroplasia
 Retroperitoneal fibrosis
 Retroperitoneal liposarcoma

Rett
 Rett like syndrome
 Rett  syndrome

Rev–Rey
 Revesz syndrome
 Reye's syndrome
 Reynolds–Neri–Hermann syndrome
 Reynolds syndrome

Rh
 Rh disease
 Rhabditida infections
 Rhabdoid tumor
 Rhabdomyolysis
 Rhabdomyomatous dysplasia cardiopathy genital anomalies
 Rhabdomyosarcoma
 Rhabdomyosarcoma 1
 Rhabdomyosarcoma 2
 Rhabdomyosarcoma, alveolar
 Rhabdomyosarcoma, embryonal
 Rheumatic fever
 Rheumatism
 Rheumatoid arthritis
 Rheumatoid purpura
 Rheumatoid vasculitis
 Rhinotillexomania
 Rhizomelic dysplasia type Patterson–Lowry
 Rhizomelic pseudopolyarthritis
 Rhizomelic syndrome
 Rhypophobia
 Rhytiphobia

Ri

Rib–Rig
 Ribbing disease
 Richards–Rundle syndrome
 Richieri–Costa–Colletto–Otto syndrome
 Richieri–Costa–Da Silva syndrome
 Richieri–Costa–Gorlin syndrome
 Richieri–Costa–Guion–Almeida syndrome
 Richieri–Costa–Guion–Almeida acrofacial dysostosis
 Richieri–Costa–Guion–Almeida–Cohen syndrome
 Richieri–Costa–Guion–Almeida dwarfism
 Richieri–Costa–Guion–Almeida–Rodini syndrome
 Richieri–Costa–Montagnoli syndrome
 Richieri–Costa–Orquizas syndrome
 Richieri–Costa–Silveira–Pereira syndrome
 Richter syndrome
 Rickets
 Rickettsial disease
 Rickettsialpox
 Rickettsiosis
 Rieger syndrome
 Rift Valley fever
 Right atrium familial dilatation
 Right ventricle hypoplasia
 Rigid mask like face deafness polydactyly
 Rigid spine syndrome

Ril–Riv
 Riley–Day syndrome
 Ringed hair disease
 Ringworm
 Rivera–Perez–Salas syndrome

Ro
 Roberts syndrome
 Robin sequence and oligodactyly
 Robinow–Sorauf syndrome
 Robinow syndrome
 Robinson–Miller–Bensimon syndrome
 Roch–Leri mesosomatous lipomatosis
 Rocky Mountain spotted fever
 Rod monochromacy
 Rod myopathy
 Rodini–Richieri–Costa syndrome
 Rokitansky–Kuster–Hauser syndrome
 Rokitansky sequence
 Romano–Ward syndrome
 Romberg hemi-facial atrophy
 Rombo syndrome
 Rommen–Mueller–Sybert syndrome
 Rosai–Dorfman disease
 Rosenberg–Chutorian syndrome
 Rosenberg–Lohr syndrome
 Roseola infantum
 Rothmund–Thomson syndrome
 Rotor syndrome
 Roussy–Levy hereditary areflexic dystasia
 Rowley–Rosenberg syndrome
 Roy–Maroteaux–Kremp syndrome
 Rozin–Hertz–Goodman syndrome

Ru
 Rubella virus antenatal infection
 Rubella, congenital
 Rubella
 Rubeola
 Rubinstein–Taybi like syndrome
 Rubinstein–Taybi syndrome (gene promoter involvement)
 Rudd Klimek syndrome
 Rudiger syndrome
 Rumination syndrome
 Rupophobia
 Rutledge–Friedman Harrod syndrome
 Ruvalcaba–Churesigaew–Myhre syndrome
 Ruvalcaba syndrome
 Ruvalcaba–Myhre syndrome
 Ruvalcaba–Myhre–Smith syndrome (BRR)
 Ruzicka Goerz Anton syndrome

R